

Events 
 January – Fabrizio Dentice entered the service of Ottavio Farnese, Duke of Parma as a lutenist
July 22 – Lodovico Bassano is appointed to the London-based Bassano recorder consort, retrospectively effective to 29 September 1568.
 October – Valentin Bakfark, Hungarian lutenist, is arrested on suspicion of involvement in a Hungarian rebellion against his employer, Emperor Maximilian II, but he is quickly released.
date unknown – A portrait of Josquin des Prez, possibly painted in his lifetime, is installed as a side panel of a triptych in the church of Ste Gudule, Brussels. It was destroyed a decade later, along with all the other images in the church, by Protestant iconoclasts.

Publications

Secular music
 Jacques Arcadelt
Sixth book of chansons (Paris: Le Roy & Ballard), published posthumously
Ninth book of chansons (Paris: Le Roy & Ballard), published posthumously
 Filippo Azzaiolo – , for four voices (Venice: Antonio Gardano)
 Ippolito Chamaterò
, for four voices (Venice: Girolamo Scotto)
, for five voices (Venice: Girolamo Scotto)
, for five voices (Venice: Girolamo Scotto)
, for five voices (Venice: Girolamo Scotto)
 Giovanni Matteo Faà di Bruno – First book of madrigals for five voices (Venice: Antonio Gardano)
 Tiburtio Massaino – First book of madrigals for four voices (Venice: Antonio Gardano)
 Philippe de Monte
First book of madrigals for six voices (Venice: Claudio da Correggio)
Second book of madrigals for six voices (Venice: Girolamo Scotto)
Second book of madrigals for four voices (Venice: Girolamo Scotto)
Costanzo Porta – Second book of madrigals for five voices (Venice: Antonio Gardano)

Sacred music
Paolo Aretino – Magnificat for five voices, book 1 (Venice: Claudio Correggio)
Joachim a Burck –  for four voices (Mühlhausen: Georg Hantzsch)
Ippolito Chamaterò – First book of masses for five and seven voices (Venice: Girolamo Scotto)
Sigmund Hemmel –  for four voices (Tubingen: Ulrich Morharts), a German-language psalter, published posthumously
Paolo Isnardi
 for four voices (Venice: Antonio Gardano)
 for five voices (Venice: heirs of Girolamo Scotto)
Orlande de Lassus –  for five voices (Munich: Adam Berg), a collection of motets
Giovanni Pierluigi da Palestrina – Liber primus motettorum, for five to seven voices, published in Rome

Births 
16 November – Paul Sartorius, composer and organist (died 1609)
probable – Tobias Hume, viol player and composer (died 1645)

Deaths 
 11 September – Vincenza Armani, Italian opera singer, musician and composer
 20 September – Agostino Agostini, Italian composer and singer
date unknown – Hoste da Reggio, composer (born c. 1520)

References

 
Music
16th century in music
Music by year